The East Greenbush Central School District is a public school district located in East Greenbush, New York. Approximately 4,000 students are enrolled in seven schools - one high school, one middle school and five neighborhood elementary schools.

All district schools are in Good Standing according to the New York State Education Department.

Columbia High School has a 97% graduation rate and was named a Recognition School by the New York State Education Department in 2019 and 2020.

Schools

Elementary
Bell Top Elementary School
Donald P. Sutherland Elementary School
Genet Elementary School
Green Meadow Elementary School
Red Mill Elementary School

Middle
Goff Middle School

High
Columbia High School

Board of Education Members
Michael Buono (President), Kathleen Curtin, John Dunn Jr., Cheryl Kennedy (Assistant Clerk), Mark Mann (Vice President), Jennifer O'Brien, Michele Skumurski, JoAnn Taylor (Deputy Treasurer), and Frank Yeboah.

References

External links
 

School districts in New York (state)
Education in Rensselaer County, New York